The National Air and Space Intelligence Center (NASIC) is the United States Air Force unit for analyzing military intelligence on foreign air and space forces, weapons, and systems.  NASIC assessments of aerospace performance characteristics, capabilities, and vulnerabilities are used to shape national security and defense policies and supports weapons treaty negotiations and verification.

History
In 1917 the Foreign Data Section of the Army Signal Corps’ Airplane Engineering Department was established at McCook Field, and a NASIC predecessor operated the Army Aeronautical Museum (now National Museum of the Air Force) initially at McCook and then on August 22, 1935 at Wright Field in Dayton, Ohio. The Office of the Chief of Air Corps's Information Division had become the OCAC Intelligence Division by 1939, which transferred into the United States Army Air Forces (USAAF) as AC/AS, Intelligence and was known as A-2 (in April, 1942, the Air Intelligence School was at the Harrisburg Academy.)  The United States Army Air Forces evaluated foreign aircraft during World War II with the "T-2 Intelligence Department at Wright Field and Freeman Field, Indiana". In July 1944, Wright Field analysts fired a V-1 engine reconstructed from "Robot Blitz" wreckage (an entire V-1 was reconstructed at Republic Aviation by September 8).  Post-war, Operation Lusty recruited German technology experts who were interrogated prior to working in the United States, e.g., Dr. Herbert Wagner at a Point Mugu USMC detachment and Walter Dornberger at Bell Aircraft.  The "capability…anticipated for Soviet intercontinental jet bombers" (e.g., in NSC 20/4 in the fall of 1945) determined a Radar Fence was needed for sufficient U.S. warning and that the "1954 Interceptor" (F-106) was needed (specified in the January 13, 1949, Air Development Order):  "the appearance of a Soviet jet bomber [was in the] 1954…May Day parade".

"By 1944, it had become obvious that German aeronautical technology was superior in many ways, to that of this country, and we needed to obtain this technology and make use of it," said P-47 and Messerschmitt ME-262 pilot USAAF Lieutenant Roy Brown during a speech at NASIC in 2014. To accomplish this task, then Colonel Harold E. Watson was sent from Wright Field to Europe in 1944, to locate German aircraft of advanced design. Watson would become an integral part of forming the intelligence unit that would eventually become NASIC.

Air Technical Intelligence Center
On May 21, 1951, the Air Technical Intelligence Center (ATIC) was established as a USAF field activity of the Assistant Chief of Staff for Intelligence.  ATIC analyzed engine parts and the tail section of a Mikoyan-Gurevich MiG-15 and in July, the center received a complete MiG-15 that had crashed.  ATIC also obtained IL-10 and Yak-9 aircraft in operational condition, and monitored a captured MiG-15's flight test program. ATIC awarded a contract to Battelle Memorial Institute for translation and analysis of materiel and documents gathered during the Korean War. Analysis allowed FEAF to develop fighter engagement tactics.  In 1958 ATIC had a Readix Computer in Building 828, 1 of 6 WPAFB buildings used by the unit prior to the center built in 1976. 

Discoverer 29 (launched April 30, 1961) then photographed the "first Soviet ICBM offensive launch complex" at Plesetsk. The Defense Intelligence Agency was created on October 1.

Foreign Technology Division
In 1961 ATIC became the Foreign Technology Division (FTD) which was reassigned to Air Force Systems Command (AFSC), and FTD intelligence estimates were subsequently provided to the National Security Council through the 1962 United States Intelligence Board (cf. the CIA's Board of National Estimates).  FTD's additional location at the Tonopah Test Range Airport conducted test and evaluation of captured Soviet fighter aircraft (AFSC recruited its pilots from the Edwards AFB Air Force Test Center). The aircraft of the 1966 Iraqi Air Force MiG-21 defection was loaned by Israel to the U.S. Air Force and transferred to Nevada for study. In 1968, the US Air Force and Navy HAVE DOUGHNUT project flew the aircraft at Area 51 for simulated air combat training (renamed HAVE DRILL and transferred to the Tonopah TTR ).  U.S. casualties flying foreign aircraft included those in the 1979 Tonopah MiG-17 crash during training versus a Northrop F-5 and the 1984 Little Skull Mountain MiG-23 crash which killed a USAF general.

FTD detachments were located in Virginia, California (Det 2), Germany, Japan (Det 4), and Det 5—first in Massachusetts and later Colorado (Buckley ANGB).  By 1968 FTD had an "Aerial Phenomenon Office" and in 1983, FTD/OLAI at the Cheyenne Mountain Complex published the Analysis of Cosmos 1220 and Cosmos 1306 Fragments.

In 1971 the FTD obtained, translated, and published a copy of the paper Method of Edge Waves in the Physical Theory of Diffraction, originally a Russian-language work by Pyotr Ufimtsev of the Central Research Radio Engineering Institute [ЦНИРТИ] of the Defense Ministry of the Soviet Union, which became the basis for stealth aircraft technology.

National Air Intelligence Center

In October 1993 at the end of the Cold War, FTD became the National Air Intelligence Center as "a component of the Air Intelligence Agency", and by 2005 had a Signals Exploitation Division   after being renamed the National Air and Space Intelligence Center on February 15, 2003.

NASIC's Defense Intelligence Space Threat Committee coordinates "a wide variety of complex space/counterspace analytical activities." The Center includes a library with interlibrary loan to Air University, etc.

Organization
NASIC is an operation wing and Field Operating Agency (FOA) of the USAF; as an FOA, it reports to the Air Staff through the Deputy Chief of Staff for ISR and Cyber Effects Operations. The Center is led by a Commander, currently Col. Maurizio Calabrese, and has an annual budget of over $507 million.

NASIC's 4,100 civilian, military, Reserve, National Guard, and contract personnel are split between the Centers' four intelligence analysis groups, four support directorates, and 18 squadrons. 

The Air and Cyberspace Intelligence Group; Geospatial and Signatures Intelligence Group; Global Exploitation Intelligence Group; and Space, Missiles and Forces Intelligence Group comprise the four intelligence groups; the Directorate of Communications and Information, Directorate of Personnel, Directorate of Facilities and Logistics, and Directorate of Plans and Operations comprise the four support directorates.

Lineage 
 Established, activated, and organized as Foreign Technology Division on 1 July 1961
 Redesignated: Air Force Foreign Technology Center on 1 October 1991
 Redesignated: Foreign Aerospace Science and Technology Center on 1 January 1992
 Redesignated: National Air Intelligence Center on 1 October 1993
 Redesignated: National Air and Space Intelligence Center on 20 February 2003

Assignments
 Air Force Systems Command, 1 July 1961 – 30 September 1991
 Air Force Intelligence Command (later redesignated Air Intelligence Agency, Air Force ISR Agency, then Twenty-Fifth Air Force), 1 October 1991 – 30 September 2014
 NOTE: On 11 October 2019, Twenty-Fifth Air Force merged with Twenty-Fourth Air Force to form Sixteenth Air Force 
 Air Staff (United States), Headquarters U.S. Air Force/A2, 1 October 2014 – present

List of commanders 
 Brig. Gen. Arthur J. Pierce, February 1961 – July 1964
 Brig. Gen. Arthur W. Cruikshank Jr., July 1964 – August 1966
 Col. Raymond S. Sleeper, August 1966 – November 1968
 Col. George R. Weinbrenner, November 1968 – July 1974
 Col. James W. Rawers, July 1974 – July 1975
 Col. Howard E. Wright, January 1977 – June 1981
 Col. David S. Watrous, June 1981 – February 1983
 Col. Earl A. Pontius, February 1983 – June 1986
 Col. Gary Culp, June 1986 – August 1988
 Brig. Gen. Francis C. Gideon, August 1988 – June 1992
 Col. Gary D. Payton, July 1994 – August 1996
 Col. Kenneth K. Dumm, August 1996 – December 1997
 Col. Richard G. Annas, December 1997 – September 2000
 Col. Steven R. Capenos, September 2000 – July 2002
 Col. Mark C. Christian, July 2002 – September 2004
 Col. Joseph J. Pridotkas, September 2004 – July 2006
 Col. Karen A. Cleary, July 2006 – June 2008
 Col. D. Scott George (BG Select), June 2008 – June 2010
 Col. Kathleen C. Sakura, June 2010 – May 2012
 Col. Aaron M. Prupas, May 2012 – June 2014
 Col. Leah G. Lauderback, June 2014 – May 2016
 Col. Sean P. Larkin, May 2016 – June 2018
 Col. Parker H. Wright, June 28, 2018 – May 2020
 Col. Maurizio D. Calabrese,  June 9, 2020 - Present

Decorations 

 Air and Space Organizational Excellence Award 
 1 October 1996 - 30 September 1998 (as National Air Intelligence Center)
 1 June 2000 - 31 May 2002 (as National Air Intelligence Center)
 1 June 2001 - 31 May 2003 (as National Air Intelligence Center)
 1 June 2003 - 31 May 2004 
 1 November 2007 - 31 December 2008
 1 January 2013 - 31 December 2014 
 1 January 2015 - 31 December 2016

Stations 
 Wright-Patterson Air Force Base, Dayton, Ohio, 1 July 1961 – present

See also 
 Space Delta 18

References

Centers of the United States Air Force
Intelligence units of the United States Air Force
Military units and formations established in 1993
Technical intelligence
Intelligence analysis agencies